The 1934 Major League Baseball All-Star Game was the second playing of the mid-summer classic between the all-stars of the American League (AL) and National League (NL), the two leagues comprising Major League Baseball. The game was held on July 10 at the Polo Grounds in Manhattan, the home of the New York Giants of the National League. The game resulted in the American League defeating the National League 9–7. Every starter on both teams except Wally Berger was later inducted into the National Baseball Hall of Fame.

The game is well known among baseball historians for the performance of NL starting pitcher Carl Hubbell. After allowing the first two batters to reach base on a single and a base on balls, Hubbell struck out five of the game's best hitters – Babe Ruth, Lou Gehrig, Jimmie Foxx, Al Simmons and Joe Cronin – in succession, setting a longstanding All-Star Game record for consecutive strikeouts.

Rosters
Players in italics have since been inducted into the National Baseball Hall of Fame.

American League

National League

Game

Umpires
Cy Pfirman, NL (home), Brick Owens, AL (first base), Dolly Stark, NL (second base), George Moriarty, AL (third base); the umpires rotated positions clockwise in the middle of the fifth inning, with Owens moving behind the plate.

Starting lineups

Linescore

References

External links
Baseball Almanac

Major League Baseball All-Star Game
Major League Baseball All-Star Game
Sports in Manhattan
Major League Baseball All Star Game
Baseball competitions in New York City
Major League Baseball All-Star Game
1930s in Manhattan
Washington Heights, Manhattan